Ragged Appleshaw is a hamlet in the civil parish of Appleshaw in the Test Valley district of Hampshire, England. Its nearest town is Andover, which lies approximately 4.2 miles (6.7 km) south-east from the hamlet.

Villages in Hampshire
Test Valley